Nosferattus ciliatus is a jumping spider.

Etymology
The epitheton ("ciliated") refers to the ventral edge of the cymbium.

Appearance
The males are about 3mm long, with a yellow carapace; no females have been described.

Distribution
N. ciliatus is only known only from the State of Maranhão in Brazil.

External links
Three new genera of jumping spider from Brazil (Araneae, Salticidae) (2005)

Sitticini
Spiders of Brazil
Spiders described in 2005